American Council may refer to:

Linguistics

 American Council of Teachers of Russian, an organization that has to advance research development in Russian and English language
 American Council on the Teaching of Foreign Languages, a national organization dedicated to the teaching of languages

Religion

 American Anglican Council, a conservative organization within the Episcopal Church in the US
 American Council of Christian Churches, a militant fundamentalist organization set up in opposition to the Federal Council of Churches
 American Muslim Council, an Islamic organization that has been investigated for links to terrorism

Science

 American Chemistry Council, an industry trade association for American chemical companies
 American Council on Science and Health, an advocacy organization founded in 1978 by Elizabeth Whelan

Other fields

 American Council for Cultural Policy, a group of wealthy and politically influential antiquities dealers, collectors and lawyers
 American Council on Education, a non-profit lobbying organization for higher education in the US and which administers the GED Test
 American Council of Learned Societies, a private non-profit federation of sixty-eight scholarly organizations
 American Council of Life Insurers, a Washington-based lobbying and trade group for the life insurance industry
 American Council of the Blind, a nationwide organisation in the US
 American Council of Trustees and Alumni, an education organization
 American Council on Alcohol Problems, a federation of 37 state affiliates promoting the reduction of alcohol advertising
 American Foreign Policy Council, a non-profit organization dedicated to bringing information to those who make foreign policy
 American Pie Council, the only organization committed to preserving America's pie heritage
 American Plastics Council, a major trade association for the U.S. plastics industry